Kyra E. Hicks (born October 1, 1965) is an author, quilter and quilt historian. She writes about African-American quilt history and encouraging quilt documentation. She has created story quilts, such as Black Barbie, which is in the permanent collection of the Fenimore Art Museum in New York City.

Education
Kyra Hicks graduated from Howard University and the University of Michigan. She works professionally as an ecommerce and marketing director. She lives in Arlington, Virginia.

Quilting
Hicks specializes in creating narrative or story quilts. The themes include being a single black woman, politics, family, and religion. All of her quilts include words as well as designs.

Her Patriotic Quilt (1995) is in the permanent collection of the Museum of Arts and Design in New York. It includes the names of prominent American black women Lani Guinier, Joycelyn Elders, and Anita Hill.

Hicks created her Black Barbie quilt, which was displayed in the Fenimore Art Museum's exhibition Through the Eyes of Others: African Americans and Identity in American Art (2010). She addressed issues of body image, western society's obsession with beauty, and the neglect of the African American when creating toys and other ephemera for children. The illustration features the American Barbie doll depicted as a black woman, with the text "Barbie" above it, and below it the phrase: "Was never intended for me." But Mattel sold the first black Barbie fashion doll in 1980.

Research
In her quilt history research, Hicks found only the second known photograph to exist of Harriet Powers, an African-American slave, folk artist and quilt maker from rural Georgia. Powers used traditional appliqué techniques to record local legends, Bible stories, and astronomical events on her quilts. Two if her quilts have survived: Bible Quilt (1886) and Pictorial Quilt (1898).

Hicks has confirmed the price of Pictorial Quilt, paid by owner Maxim Karolik. After acquiring it, he donated the quilt to the Museum of Fine Arts, Boston.

Hicks was one of four African-American women quilters profiled in a PhD dissertation by Yolanda Woods, New World African Conjurers Who Edify and Heal the Community.

Bibliography

 Martha Ann’s Quilt for Queen Victoria (2007)
 This I Accomplish: Harriet Powers’ Bible Quilt and Other Pieces (2009)
 1.6 Million African American Quilters: Survey, Sites, and a Half-Dozen Art Quilt Blocks (2010)
 The Lord’s Supper Pattern Book: Imagining Harriet Powers’ Lost Bible Story Quilt (2011)
 How to Self-Publish Your Own Quilt Catalog: A Workbook for Quilters, Guilds, Galleries and Textile Artists (2012)
 Franklin Roosevelt’s Postage Stamp Quilt: The Story of Estella Weaver Nukes’ Presidential Gift (2012)
 Liberia: A Visit Through Books (2008, co-author)
 The Return of the Guinea Fowl: An Autobiographical Novel of a Liberian Doctor (2011, co-author) 
 Crafted Lives: Stories and Studies of African American Quilters, Patricia A. Turner. University Press of Mississippi (2009). Kyra Hicks wrote the foreword
 The Quilt: A History and Celebration of an American Art Form, by Elise Schebler Roberts, with contributions from Jennifer Chiaverini, Sandra Dallas, Kyra Hicks and Helen Kelley. Voyageur Press (2007). Hicks contributed the article "Black Women Have Always Quilted."
 St. James Guide to Black Artists.  Edited by Thomas Riggs. St. James Press (1997). Hicks contributed the profile of Sonia Boyce, British Painter and Mixed Media Artist.

References

External links

American art historians
Quilters
1965 births
Living people
Writers from Los Angeles
Howard University alumni
University of Michigan alumni
American women historians
Women art historians
Artists from Los Angeles
20th-century American historians
20th-century American women writers
20th-century American artists
20th-century American women artists
American textile artists
21st-century American historians
21st-century American women writers
21st-century American artists
21st-century American women artists
Historians from California